Bradyrhizobium ottawaense is a nitrogen fixing bacterium from the genus of Bradyrhizobium which has been isolated from the nodules of soybeans in Ottawa in Canada.

References

Nitrobacteraceae
Bacteria described in 2014